João Carlos Gregório Domingos Vicente Francisco de Saldanha Oliveira e Daun, 1st Duke of Saldanha, (17 November 1790 – 20 November 1876) was a Portuguese marshal and statesman.

Early life and schooling
Saldanha was born on 17 November 1790, in Azinhaga.  He was a grandson of Sebastião José de Carvalho e Melo, 1st Marquis of Pombal, the Secretary of the State of the Kingdom of Portugal and the Algarves to King Joseph I of Portugal.

Saldanha studied at Coimbra, served against the French, and was made a prisoner in 1810.  On his release he went to Brazil, where he was employed in the military and diplomatic services.  He returned to Portugal after the declaration of the independence of Brazil.

Liberal Wars
The Duke of Saldanha, as he is commonly known, was one of the most dominating personalities of war and politics in Portugal, from the revolution of 1820 to his death in 1876. During that period he led no less than seven coups d'état. He played an important part in the struggle between brothers Pedro IV of Portugal (I of Brazil) and Miguel of Portugal during the Liberal Wars.

Saldanha became Minister of Foreign Affairs in 1825 and was governor of Porto in 1826–27. He joined Dom Pedro against the usurper Dom Miguel. He fought in the Belfastada, the Siege of Porto and Battle of Almoster. In 1833, he was rewarded with the title of Marshal of Portugal and one year later, he concluded the Concession of Evoramonte with the defeated usurper Dom Miguel. 
In 1835 he was made Minister of War and President of the Council but resigned the same year. After the revolution of 1836, which he had instigated he went into exile until recalled in 1846.

Later life
After his return from exile in 1846 Saldanha was made Duke of Saldanha, and formed a Ministry which fell in 1849. In 1851 he organized a new revolt and became chief Minister as the leader of a coalition party formed of Septembrists and dissatisfied Chartists. He remained in power until the accession of Pedro V. in 1856. and was subsequently Minister to Rome (1862–64 and 1866–69). He became Prime Minister once more for a few months in 1870 (May–August), and was sent in 1871 to London as Ambassador, where he died.

Assessment
Terence Hughes wrote a character sketch of Saldanha in 1846:

Works
Saldanha was an accomplished linguist (he spoke English, French, and German with perfect fluency) and a general scholar. He wrote On the Connexion between true Sciences and Revealed Religion which was published in Berlin.

Family
Saldanha had a son who died in Berlin in 1845.

See also
Devorismo
Revolt of the Marshals

Notes

References

Attribution

Further reading

|-

|-

1790 births
1876 deaths
People from Lisbon
101
Counts of Saldanha
Margraves of Saldanha
Prime Ministers of Portugal
Finance ministers of Portugal
Government ministers of Portugal
Field marshals of Portugal
Ambassadors of Portugal to the United Kingdom
Naval ministers of Portugal
Portuguese military personnel of the Napoleonic Wars
Military personnel of the Liberal Wars
Knights Grand Cross of the Order of the Immaculate Conception of Vila Viçosa
Grand Crosses of the Order of Christ (Portugal)
Grand Crosses of the Order of Saint James of the Sword
Knights of the Golden Fleece of Spain
Knights Grand Cross of the Order of St Gregory the Great
Grand Croix of the Légion d'honneur
Knights of the Holy Sepulchre
Knights of Malta
Portuguese nobility